During the 1996–97 English football season, Bury F.C. competed in the Football League Second Division.

Season summary
In the 1996–97 season, it was the one to remember for Bury supporters as they won the Second Division title and as a result were promoted to the second tier of English football for the first time since 1969.

Final league table

Results
Bury's score comes first

Legend

Football League Second Division

FA Cup

League Cup

Football League Trophy

Squad

References

Bury F.C. seasons
Bury